Pereda may refer to:

Antonio de Pereda (1611–1678), Spanish Baroque-era painter, best known for his still lifes
Chus Pereda (1938–2011), Spanish footballer who played for FC Barcelona during the 1960s
Diego Pereda (1574–1634), Spanish Catholic prelate, Auxiliary Bishop of Toledo
Electo Pereda, Chilean football manager
José María de Pereda (1833–1906), one of the most distinguished of modern Spanish novelists
José Pereda (born 1973), Peruvian retired footballer
Juan Pereda (1931–2012), former military general and de facto president of Bolivia (1978)
Nicolás Pereda (born 1982), Mexican-Canadian film director
Raimondo Pereda (1840–1915), Italian-Swiss sculptor
Ramón Pereda (1897–1986), Spanish-Mexican actor and filmmaker
Vicente Pereda (born 1941), Mexican retired footballer

See also
Pereda (Grado), one of 28 parishes (administrative divisions) in the municipality of Grado, in Asturias, northern Spain
Pereda Palace, a building in Buenos Aires, Argentina